Hay Foot, Straw Foot is a 1919 American silent comedy film directed by Jerome Storm and written by Julien Josephson. The film stars Charles Ray, Doris May, William Conklin, Spottiswoode Aitken and J. P. Lockney. The film was released on June 22, 1919, by Paramount Pictures. It is not known whether the film currently survives.

Plot
As described in a film magazine, enlistee Ulysses S. Grant Briggs (Ray) is bound by his father Thaddeus Briggs (Aitken), a veteran of the Civil War, to emulate his illustrious namesake in all things. He is charged in a court-martial for entering a notorious roadhouse against orders and rescuing Betty Martin (May), a young woman who aspires to the stage and had just taken part in a military camp entertainment, from the wiles of a man posing as a vaudeville agent. His father appears at the camp hearing and insists that his boy must have had a good reason for his action, but his son refuses to speak. Betty considers the disgrace she caused to the young man, comes to the camp and tells her story and secures his acquittal.

Cast
Charles Ray as Ulysses S. Grant Briggs
Doris May as Betty Martin
William Conklin as Harry Weller
Spottiswoode Aitken as Thaddeus Briggs
J. P. Lockney as Jeff Hanan

References

External links 

 

1919 films
1910s English-language films
Silent American comedy films
1919 comedy films
Paramount Pictures films
Films directed by Jerome Storm
American Civil War films
American black-and-white films
American silent feature films
1910s American films